Gerald Esdaile Winter (29 November 1876 – 17 January 1923) was an English first-class cricketer active 1896–1908 who played for Middlesex and Cambridge University. He was born in Kensington; died in Marylebone.

References

1876 births
1923 deaths
English cricketers
Middlesex cricketers
Cambridge University cricketers
Cambridgeshire cricketers
H. D. G. Leveson Gower's XI cricketers
W. G. Grace's XI cricketers
P. F. Warner's XI cricketers